Wilhelm Schreuer (28 September 1866, Wesel - 11 November 1933, Düsseldorf) was a German painter; associated with the Düsseldorfer Malerschule.

Biography 

His father, Johann Heinrich Schreuer, was a master baker. In 1872, the family moved to Cologne, where his father had bought a bakery. In addition to his professional work, he drew and painted in his spare time. As a result, Wilhelm developed an interest in art, which his family encouraged. In 1884, after completing his secondary education, he was admitted to the Kunstakademie Düsseldorf. His initial instructors were the decorative painter, Heinrich Lauenstein, and Hugo Crola, known for his portraits. From 1886 to 1890, he was a master student in the studios of Johann Peter Theodor Janssen.

From 1896, he was a member of the progressive artists' association, Malkasten. In 1899, he married the painter Maria Pauly (1874–1955), a daughter of the art dealer, Leo Pauly. They had five sons and five daughters.

In 1913, the  held an exhibition focusing on the art of various German cities, and Schreuer was chosen to represent Düsseldorf. During World War I, he served as a war painter/correspondent on the fronts in France and Belgium.

During the 1920s, he participated in numerous notable exhibitions, in both Düsseldorf and Cologne. Some of his paintings were purchased by the Wallraf-Richartz-Museum.

Most of his works were created with a distinctive technique, involving diluted colors on a damp surface, applied to glued paper; a method that makes major corrections almost impossible. The resulting surface is smooth as glass. Often, the effect is nearly monochromatic. Although he painted a wide variety of subjects, scenes from inns, restaurants, dance halls, and various events were obviously his favorites.

References

Further reading 
 "Schreuer, Wilhelm", In: Hans Vollmer (Ed.): Allgemeines Lexikon der Bildenden Künstler von der Antike bis zur Gegenwart, Vol.30: Scheffel–Siemerding. E. A. Seemann, Leipzig 1936, pg.286
 O. W. Höllig, Wilhelm Körs: Wilhelm Schreuer. Ein Düsseldorfer Maler der guten alten Zeit. Stern-Verlag, Düsseldorf 1997, 
 Hans Paffrath (Ed.): Lexikon der Düsseldorfer Malerschule 1819–1918, Vol.3: Nabert–Zwecker., Kunstmuseum Düsseldorf and the Galerie Paffrath. Bruckmann, Munich 1998, 
 Silke Köhn: "Wilhelm Schreuer (1866 Wesel–1933 Düsseldorf)", In: Sammler Journal, Dezember 2006, pp.62–69

External links 

 More works by Schreuer @ ArtNet
 

1866 births
1933 deaths
German painters
German genre painters
German war artists
Kunstakademie Düsseldorf alumni
People from Wesel